Nikitskaya Street  may refer to:
 Bolshaya Nikitskaya Street, radial street that runs west from Mokhovaya Street to Garden Ring in Moscow
 Malaya Nikitskaya Street, that runs parallel to Bolshaya Nikitskaya beyond the Boulevard Ring, see Embassy of Laos in Moscow and Embassy of Nigeria in Moscow